The 1988 UCI Road World Championships - Men's Road Race took place on 28 August 1988 in Ronse, Belgium. 

There was a crash during the final sprint. The exact reason for the crash is debatable, but it involved Steve Bauer and Claude Criquielion. As Bauer approached the line in the lead, the second rider (Claude Criquielion) attempted to pass through on the right.  Bauer protected the lead by boxing in Criquielion towards the barriers. Criquielion fell, then slid into Bauer and slowed him down, allowing Maurizio Fondriest to come around for the easy win, with Bauer second. Bauer was sued by Criquielion for assault, seeking damages of $1.5 million. Bauer won the lawsuit.

Results

References

Uci Road World Championships - Mens Road Race, 1988
UCI Road World Championships – Men's road race
1988 UCI Road World Championships